Brussels-North railway station, officially Brussels-North, is one of the three major railway stations in Brussels, Belgium; the other two are Brussels-Central and Brussels-South. Every regular domestic and international train (except Thalys and Eurostar) passing there has a planned stop. The station has 200,000 passengers per week, mainly commuters, making it one of the busiest in Belgium.

Brussels-North is the end point of the premetro (underground tram) North–South Axis (on lines 3 and 4), and an important node of the Brussels Intercommunal Transport Company (STIB/MIVB), as well as of bus lines of the Flemish transport company De Lijn. More than 30 regional bus lines depart from there, as do international Eurolines coach services.

The station is located in the Brussels municipality of Schaerbeek, in the middle of the Northern Quarter business district (also called Little Manhattan), with several corporation headquarters such as Belgacom Towers, Rogier Tower and others, government offices, as well as Flemish ministries. Right next to the station is the Rue d'Aerschot/Aarschotstraat, an area of prostitution "behind windows".

Naming
The Brussels-Capital Region is bilingual; hence, both the French and Dutch names of the station— and —are official. Outside Belgium, this often leads to the use of combined shorthands; for example in the Thomas Cook European Rail Timetable, Brussels-North is designated as  /; NS (Dutch Railways) announce the station as Brussel Noord/Nord. The station's bilingual French–Dutch name is otherwise generally translated in English to Brussels-North.

History

First and second stations (1835–1952)
The very first railway station in Brussels was / railway station near the site of today's Yser/IJzer metro station, north of the City of Brussels. It was from there that, on 5 May 1835, the first passenger train on a public railway in continental Europe departed.

This first station was replaced in March 1846 by a new monumental station on the Place Charles Rogier/Karel Rogierplein, a short distance east from the original site, on the territory of the municipality of Saint-Josse-ten-Noode. Designed by the architect François Coppens in neoclassical style, this second "North Station" was a single-storey railway complex that stretched in width from the Rue d'Aerschot/Aarschotstraat to the /, and in length, from the Place Rogier to the / (nowadays a tunnel). To connect the neighbourhoods on both sides of the railway, there were only two pedestrian bridges: one at the Place Rogier and the other at the /. It consisted of 27 tracks.

The Belgian railway network grew rapidly during the second half of the 19th century, becoming the densest in continental Europe. By then, Brussels-North and Brussels-South had become the primary railway stations in Brussels. However, they were joined only by an inadequate single track running along what is today the Small Ring (Brussels' inner ring road). Many proposals were put forward to link the two stations more substantially. A law was finally passed in 1909 mandating a direct connection; however, the final project would not be completed until nearly half a century later.

Current station (1952–present)
In 1952, a new transit station, located a few hundred metres further north, was built. It was designed in post-war modernist style by architects Jacques and Paul Saintenoy, assisted by Jean Hendrickx Vanden Bosch. The construction of the North–South connection between 1910 and 1953 ensured a train connection between the new station and the South Station. During the construction of the North–South connection, the tracks were raised and several underpasses were added. The old station on the Place Rogier was razed in 1955. A bus station was built on its former site, and then in 1960, the Rogier International Centre, also called the Martini Tower, which was formerly the tallest building in Belgium, and which housed the National Theatre of Belgium until 1999. The building was demolished in 2001, and was replaced by the  Rogier Tower. A group of statues from the station's former facade were reconstructed at the Warandepark in Diest, Flemish Brabant, Belgium.

An extensive public transport complex, the North Communication Center (or CCN), was built on the western side of the North Station in the 1970s. As a result, the station building (on the side of the /) is now part of this larger complex. The CCN connects the bus stop of De Lijn and STIB/MIVB, as well as the premetro, with the railway station. In 1992, the Brussels-Capital Region decided to erect an Art Deco-inspired office building for its officials above the CCN. Due to the construction of this CCN and the large volume of the office building above it, the architectural appearance of the North Station with its iconic clock tower was diminished.

Renovation works started in May 2010. The ticket hall was the first to be renovated and completed in 2012. The renovation works have been systematically continued since then. The intention is, among other things, to install new escalators and lifts and for the Rue d'Aerschot to have a fully-fledged entrance. Unlike the South Station, which was largely remodelled for the arrival of international express trains, the North Station has kept most of its post-war materials and decorative elements, highlighted during this recent renovation. The station has also kept its original clock tower.

Rail lines
Brussels-North has 12 platforms. These passenger lines join in the station:
 Line 0, the Brussels North-South connection
 Line 25 and 27 to Antwerp Central station
 Line 36 to Liège-Guillemins
 Line 50 to Gent-Sint-Pieters
 Line 161 to Namur
Few trains originate from Brussels-North. Instead, most trains through Brussels depart from Brussels-South, some from Schaarbeek.

Train services
The station is served by the following services:

 High speed services (ICE) Brussels - Liege - Cologne - Frankfurt
 Intercity services (IC-35) Amsterdam - The Hague - Rotterdam - Roosendaal - Antwerp - Brussels Airport - Brussels
 Intercity services (IC-16) Brussels - Namur - Arlon - Luxembourg
 Intercity services (IC-01) Ostend - Bruges - Gent - Brussels - Leuven - Liege - Welkenraedt - Eupen
 Intercity services (IC-03) Knokke/Blankenberge - Bruges - Gent - Brussels - Leuven - Hasselt - Genk
 Intercity services (IC-05) Antwerp - Mechelen - Brussels - Nivelles - Charleroi (weekdays)
 Intercity services (IC-06) Tournai - Ath - Halle - Brussels - Brussels Airport
 Intercity services (IC-06A) Mons - Braine-le-Comte - Brussels - Brussels Airport
 Intercity services (IC-11) Binche - Braine-le-Comte - Halle - Brussels - Mechelen - Turnhout (weekdays)
 Intercity services (IC-12) Kortrijk - Gent - Brussels - Leuven - Liege - Welkenraedt (weekdays)
 Intercity services (IC-14) Quiévrain - Mons - Braine-le-Comte - Brussels - Leuven - Liege (weekdays)
 Intercity services (IC-17) Brussels - Namur - Dinant (weekends)
 Intercity services (IC-18) Brussels - Namur - Liege (weekdays)
 Intercity services (IC-20) Gent - Aalst - Brussels - Hasselt - Tongeren (weekdays)
 Intercity services (IC-20) Gent - Aalst - Brussels - Dendermonde - Lokeren (weekends)
 Intercity services (IC-22) Essen - Antwerp - Mechelen - Brussels (weekdays)
 Intercity services (IC-22) Antwerp - Mechelen - Brussels - Halle - Braine-le-Comte - Binche (weekends)
 Intercity services (IC-23) Ostend - Bruges - Kortrijk - Zottegem - Brussels - Brussels Airport
 Intercity services (IC-23A) Bruges - Gent - Brussels - Brussels Airport (weekdays)
 Intercity services (IC-23A) Gent - Brussels - Brussels Airport (weekends)
 Intercity services (IC-26) Kortrijk - Tournai - Halle - Brussels - Dendermonde - Lokeren - Sint Niklaas (weekdays)
 Intercity services (IC-29) De Panne - Gent - Aalst - Brussels - Brussels Airport - Leuven - Landen
 Intercity services (IC-31) Antwerp - Mechelen - Brussels (weekdays)
 Intercity services (IC-31) Antwerp - Mechelen - Brussels - Nivelles - Charleroi (weekends)
 Brussels RER services (S1) Antwerp - Mechelen - Brussels - Waterloo - Nivelles (weekdays)
 Brussels RER services (S1) Antwerp - Mechelen - Brussels (weekends)
 Brussels RER services (S1) Brussels - Waterloo - Nivelles (weekends)
 Brussels RER services (S2) Leuven - Brussels - Halle - Braine-le-Comte
 Brussels RER services (S3) Dendermonde - Brussels - Denderleeuw - Zottegem - Oudenaarde (weekdays)
 Brussels RER services (S6) Aalst - Denderleeuw - Geraardsbergen - Halle - Brussels - Schaarbeek
 Brussels RER services (S8) Brussels - Etterbeek - Ottignies - Louvain-le-Neuve
 Brussels RER services (S10) Dendermonde - Brussels - Denderleeuw - Aalst

See also

 List of railway stations in Belgium
 Rail transport in Belgium
 Transport in Brussels
 Art Deco in Brussels
 History of Brussels

References

Notes

Bibliography

 

Railway stations in Brussels
Railway stations opened in 1846
Railway stations opened in 1852
Schaerbeek
1852 establishments in Belgium
Railway stations in Belgium opened in 1846
Railway stations in Belgium opened in 1852